
Gmina Rudziniec (dt:Rudzinitz) is a rural gmina (administrative district) in Gliwice County, Silesian Voivodeship, in southern Poland.

Villages
Gmina Rudziniec contains the villages and settlements of Bojszów, Bycina, Chechło, Kleszczów, Łącza, Łany, Ligota Łabędzka, Niekarmia, Niewiesze, Pławniowice, Poniszowice, Rudno, Rudziniec, Rzeczyce, Słupsko, Taciszów and Widów.

Neighbouring gminas
Gmina Rudziniec is bordered by the towns of Gliwice, Kędzierzyn-Koźle and Pyskowice, and by the gminas of Bierawa, Sośnicowice, Toszek and Ujazd.

References

Rudziniec
Gliwice County